Paul Foley Jr. (August 12, 1909 – July 7, 1990) was a Rear Admiral in the United States Navy. About 1937, he married the artist Cornelia MacIntyre Foley (1909–2010).  During World War II, while a commander commanding a PBY Catalina squadron in the Aleutians, Foley was involved in the recovery of the Akutan Zero. Upon his death in 1990 Foley was buried at Arlington National Cemetery.

References

1909 births
1990 deaths
United States Navy rear admirals
Burials at Arlington National Cemetery
United States Navy pilots of World War II